Aimo Tepsell (8 May 1932 – 30 June 2017) was a Finnish orienteering competitor. He received two silver medals at the 1966 World Orienteering Championships. He also received a bronze medal at the 1964 Euoropean championship.

See also
 Finnish orienteers
 List of orienteers
 List of orienteering events

References

1932 births
2017 deaths
People from Sodankylä
Finnish orienteers
Male orienteers
Foot orienteers
World Orienteering Championships medalists
Sportspeople from Lapland (Finland)